The Korg DSS-1 is a 12-bit polyphonic sampling synthesizer released in September 1986. It came out at a time when many of the popular synthesizer companies were beginning to get into sampling, an area of sound design that had previously been left to a handful of fledgling companies such as Fairlight, E-mu, and Ensoniq. Like Yamaha and Casio, however, Korg did not stay long in the sampling arena. The DSS-1 (along with the rackmount DSM-1) was the company's only sampler until 1998 when Korg introduced sampling options on their Triton and Trinity series of workstations, and on their Electribe series of drum-and-phrase samplers.

Concept and features
The DSS-1 is a 12-bit sampler with analog filters and envelopes. It can sample at 12-bit resolution, with a maximum sampling frequency of 48 kHz. The usual sample editing features are included, such as truncate, loop, crossfade, keymapping, and so on. Multisamples can contain up to 16 individual samples. A single floppy disk can hold 4 "systems", each of which stores 32 patches including all subtractive synthesis parameters and the multisamples used in those patches. The maximum internal sample memory is 256K on a factory standard unit, with some (now rare and hard-to-find) hardware upgrades that increased the memory up to 2MB. A single DSS-1 floppy disk can hold up to 512k worth of multisamples, but only a max of 256K can be loaded into the machine's internal memory.

Like most digital-analog hybrid synthesizers, its architecture is set up much in the same way as on a standard subtractive analog synthesizer. The subtractive analog engine on the DSS-1 allows for two oscillators to be combined and/or detuned. For each oscillator, one of 16 single-cycle waveform loops or full samples can be selected. Also on board the DSS-1 is a simple, non-realtime additive synthesis engine. This allows you to create single-cycle waveforms by either drawing them with a data slider, or by setting the relative amplitude levels of 128 sine waves. These digital oscillators are then fed through a fully resonant VCF and a VCA section. The DSS-1 has the same VCF as on the Korg DW series and the Poly-800 (Korg custom filter # NJM-2069). The DSS-1, unlike the DW series or the Poly-800 allows the filter to be switched between 12dB and 24dB modes.

Modulation sources include two individual sine wave LFOs (which Korg calls "MG" for "modulation generator"). There is one LFO for pitch and one for filter. There are also two separate modulation sources for the built-in twin digital delays. The DSS-1 has two 6-stage envelope generators (one for filter and one for amp). Other features on the DSS-1 are: auto-bend (which allows for a pitch glide up or down to a destination pitch), oscillator sync (unusual for a sampler), and bit-crushing from 12 bits down to 6 bits. Oscillator sync in combination with autobend (on the slaved oscillator) allows the DSS-1 to emulate pulse-width modulation.

The DSS-1 architecture is quite complex, which explains the weight of the machine (19 kilograms). Two microprocessor boards are used to control the synthesizer. The first one is built around an i8085 processor, in charge of floppy-disk management, user interface management (LCD and front panel), digital oscillator control. The second one is built around a 63B03 processor, handling MIDI communication, keyboard management and control-voltage generation. The digital oscillators are built around a specialized circuitry (based on ASIC), in charge of playing back samples stored in DRAM. Each DRAM chip stores 262,144 bits, and there are 12 memory chips used in parallel to store the 12 bits samples. A 16-channel digital-to-analog converter (DAC) generates the 16 oscillator signals (8 voices of polyphony with 2 oscillators per voice), being fed into the analog processing unit built around 8 VCF/VCA chips, each of them being controlled by voltages generated from the 63B03 processor board.

At the tail end of the DSS-1's audio path are two built-in digital delays. The audio signal from the VCA is converted back to digital, run through the twin DDLs (which can be run in parallel or in serial), and then converted back to analog for the final output. Each DDL has a separate modulation source (separate from the MG section) for modulation of the delayed signals. In parallel mode, the DDL section creates stereo sound by each DDL sending its sound through the unit's separate left and right outputs. The DDL boards are the same as the one used in DW-8000 synthesizer, they are built around a specialized integrated circuit connected to two DRAM chips. This circuit is in charge of delaying the digital signal after its conversion using a successive-approximation register. The design of the circuit is not very common, since it uses the same DAC both to generate the output audio after being delayed and for converting incoming analog signal into digital domain. Feedback and effect level are controlled by a TC9154 analog mixer chip.

The DSS-1 has its operating system stored on ROM chips, so if you lose your floppy disks you can still boot the system up (unlike the E-mu Emulator, Ensoniq Mirage, and early Roland samplers which required you always have a floppy disk containing the OS). However, each time you boot up the DSS-1 you will not have any sounds available until you load a system into memory from floppy disk. This can usually take anywhere from 20 to 40 seconds, depending on the size and number of multisamples contained in that system. The floppies that the DSS-1 understands are the older DSDD (double-sided double-density) disks that were also used on the Ensoniq Mirage and on early Macintosh computers.

For performance control, Korg offers up their standard 4-way joystick (same one found on DW series and Poly-800), and channel aftertouch (not polyphonic aftertouch) and velocity control. One can also assign a parameter to one of the data sliders for tweaking in realtime. It does not include portamento, an arpeggiator, or a built-in sequencer.

Retrofit kit (2010)
In 2010, Tom Virostek has presented a retrofit kit for the DSS-1. This kit installs itself over the 8085 CPU board, and replaces the processor by a much more powerful and faster NEC V40 processor. Among other improvements (e.g. the addition of portamento), the latest version of the kit supports up to 16 Msamples (against the original 256K), and allows to load data from a USB key.

VST control
In 2012, the Dutch company KissBox introduced a VST plugin (written by B. Bouchez) designed as a librarian/editor for the DSS-1, named VSTizer DSS1. The plugin does not generate sounds by itself, it is designed to remotely control the DSS-1 over a RTP MIDI communication link. This plugin simplifies sound edition (the DSS-1 uses a single slider for the 78 parameters of a sound, combined with numerical entry via the keypad). It is also able to load and save the complete synthesizer memory over MIDI, including the samples (avoiding the use of the DSS-1 floppy disk). The author of the plugin is planning to convert the complete disk library into VST banks.

Notable users
Kevin Moore of Dream Theater.
Phil Lanzon of Uriah Heep.
Steve Winwood.
Depeche Mode (during Black Celebration album production and tour).
Grup Yorum on their debut album, Sıyrılıp Gelen.
Simian Sound Source
Jean Michel Jarre
Dominique Perrier
Minoru Mukaiya of Casiopea
Rick Wakeman

References

Further reading

External links
 Korg DSS1 page with audio clips, manual and schematics

DSS-1
Samplers (musical instrument)
Polyphonic synthesizers
Digital synthesizers
Musical instruments invented in the 1980s